Baraat or Varyatra is a groom's wedding procession in Indian subcontinent. In Indian subcontinent, it is customary for the bridegroom to travel to the wedding venue (often the bride's house) on a mare (or vintage car now a days and chariots or elephants in the past), accompanied by his family members.

The baraat can become a large procession, with booking its own band, dancers, and budget. The groom and his horse are covered in finery and do not usually take part in the dancing and singing; that is left to the "baraatis" or people accompanying the procession. The groom usually carries a sword. The term baraati is also more generically used to describe any invitee from the groom's side. Traditionally, baraatis are attended to as guests of the bride's family.

The baraat, headed by a display of fireworks and accompanied by the rhythm of the dhol, reaches the meeting point, where the elders of both the families meet. In Indian Hindu weddings, the groom is greeted with garlands, tilak and aarti. In traditional Indian weddings, baraats are welcomed at the wedding venue with the sound of shehnais or nadswaram, which are considered auspicious at weddings by Hindus.

Etymology 
The word Baraat is derived from Sanskrit word Varayātrā (वरयात्रा) literally meaning groom's procession.

Marathi Varaat 
In Marathi tradition, bridegroom's procession is called 'Varaat' and is accompanied by family members and relatives. After completion of wedding customs, the bride and groom carry the silver image of Goddess Gauri which the bride had worshipped during  Gaurihar Puja (custom performed before the beginning of wedding).

Odia Baraat or Barjaatri or Varanugaman 
In Odia language, Baraat is also called Barjaatri or Varanugaman where Bar (Var) means groom, jaatra (yaatra) means procession/journey and anugaman means arrival. In this ceremonial procession the groom and his family members and friends arrive at the wedding mandap amid great pomp and magnificence. Aarti and Tilak of groom is performed and he is also offered curd mixed with honey or jaggery.

Bengali Boraat or Borjatri 
In Bengali tradition, Bor Jatri is basically the baraat, where the groom, his family and friends dress up for the wedding and start their journey to the bride’s house or the wedding venue. After the bor jatri or the baraat reaches the bride’s place, the bride’s mother along with other family members welcome the groom by blowing shankhs (conch shells) and his side of the family by doing aarti with the holy lamp and serving the sweets and drinks.

Punjabi baraat
Both men and women participate in the procession of a Punjabi baraat. Close male relatives of both the bride and groom always wear turbans, which indicates honor.

Rajput Baraat 
The bridegroom is usually dressed in a gold achkan, with an orange turban and a churidar or jodhpurs with juttis. The baraat members also must wear achkans or sherwanis with jodhpurs and safas (colorful turbans). The procession to the bride's house looks rather regal as there is absolutely no dancing on the streets by the baraatis. In fact, all members, including the groom who rides an elephant or a female horse, carry swords. The horse is important for the Rajputs

Gujarati Baraat or Varghodo
In a Gujarati wedding, the groom arrives at the bride’s house on a horse and is followed by a dancing procession lead by his family members and friends is called Varghodo or Jaan. They are also accompanied by a group of band members playing instrumental music. The groom, in reverence, touches feet of mother-in-law. A playful ritual where mother in law grabs nose of groom is performed which is a reminder to groom that mother-in-law is giving her beloved and precious daughter to him, so he should be humble and grateful.

The Milni

A simple ceremony takes place and both families exchange well wishes on meeting each other. This is followed by light snacks and tea before the religious ceremony begins.

A mother & daughter enjoy the moment. One by one designated family members exchange garlands and a hug.

Nepali-Sikkimese Baraat or Janti 
In Nepal and Sikkim state of India, Baraat is also known by the name Janti & Baryatra. Janti or Baryatra is the groom’s wedding procession which goes from his house to the bride’s to bring her to his house. The Janti consisting of the groom’s family members, relatives and friends, sets out for the bride’s home. It is accompanied by a musical band, indulges in dance and merrymaking all along the way.

Maithil baraat

Telugu Edurukolu 
In Telugu weddings, Edurukolu ceremony is the equivalent of Baraat ceremony. In Edurukolu ceremony, the groom's procession is grandly welcomed by the bride's party amidst traditional music of 'Nadaswaram'/'Sannai Melam'. The groom and his parents are specially welcomed by the bride's parents when the bride's mother applies 'kumkum' on the groom's and his mother's forehead followed by 'Harati' (waving the plate with burning camphor) to the groom.

Kannada/Tulu Dibbana 
The wedding processions in Kannada & Tuluva tradition are referred to as Dibbana. The start of Dibbana procession is preceded by Vāhana Pujā where prayer is performed using kumkum & coconut for safe journey of the groom. The groom and his family members and friends adorn Peta (Mysore cap). Musicians play instruments like nadaswaram. On arrival at marriage venue, groom is welcomed using Akshat (rice) and Aarti.

Tamil Janavasam 
The groom's procession in Tamil tradition is known by the name Janavasam. During Janavasam, the groom boards a beautifully decorated car. He is accompanied by a large marriage procession of close friends and relatives. Professional musicians are invited to entertain the procession, by playing traditional wedding songs. Fireworks form a part of the marriage celebrations. The bride's brother puts garland around the groom's neck, in order to welcome him at the entrance of the kalyana mandapam (wedding hall).

References

External links
 Indian Baraat

Marriage, unions and partnerships in Pakistan
Marriage in Hinduism